Yang Yuhuan (22 June, 719 – 15 July 756), often known as Yang Guifei (with Guifei being the highest rank for imperial consorts during her time), and known briefly by the Taoist nun name Taizhen was the beloved consort of Emperor Xuanzong of Tang during his later years. She is known as one of the Four Beauties of ancient China.

During the An Lushan Rebellion, as Emperor Xuanzong and his cortege were fleeing from the capital Chang'an to Chengdu, the emperor's guards demanded that he put Yang to death because they blamed the rebellion on her cousin Yang Guozhong and the rest of her family. The emperor capitulated and reluctantly ordered his attendant Gao Lishi to supervise her forced suicide.

Background
Yang was born in 719 during the Tang Dynasty, early in the reign of Emperor Xuanzong. Her great-great-grandfather Yang Wang was a key official during the reign of Emperor Yang of Sui, and, after the fall of the Sui Dynasty, served one of the contenders to succeed Sui, Wang Shichong; Yang Wang was then killed when Wang Shichong was defeated by Tang forces in 621. Yang Wang was from Huayin (in modern Weinan, Shaanxi), but his clan subsequently relocated to Yongle (in modern Yuncheng, Shanxi).

Yang's father Yang Xuanyan served as a census official at Shu Prefecture (in modern Chengdu, Sichuan), and his family went there with him. He appeared to have had no sons, but had four daughters who were known to history—Yang Yuhuan and three older sisters. Yang Xuanyan died when Yang Yuhuan was still young, so the latter was raised by her uncle Yang Xuanjiao, who was a low-ranking official at Henan Municipality (modern Luoyang).

Princess and Taoist nun
In 733, fourteen-year-old Yang Yuhuan married Li Mao, the Prince of Shou and the son of Emperor Xuanzong and Consort Wu. She thus carried the title of Princess of Shou. After Consort Wu died in 737, Emperor Xuanzong was greatly saddened by the death of his then-favorite concubine. Some time after that, however, Princess Yang somehow came into Xuanzong's favor and the Emperor decided to take her as his consort. However, since Princess Yang was already the wife of his son, Emperor Xuanzong stealthily arranged her to become a Taoist nun, with the tonsured name Taizhen, in order to prevent criticism that would affect his plan of making her his concubine. Yang then stayed, for a brief moment, as a Taoist nun in the palace itself, before Emperor Xuanzong made her an imperial consort after bestowing a new wife on his son Li Mao. Yang became the favorite consort of the Emperor.

Imperial consort

In 745, after Emperor Xuanzong gave the daughter of the general Wei Zhaoxun to Li Mao as his new wife and princess, he officially made Taizhen an imperial consort—with the newly restored rank of Guifei, which was greater than the previously highest rank of Huifei, carried by Consort Wu. He bestowed posthumous honors on her father Yang Xuanyan and granted her mother the title of Lady of Liang. He also gave high offices to her uncle Yang Xuangui and cousins Yang Xian and Yang Qi. Since 745, all within the imperial court and the palace had treated her as like new empress (像皇后, Xiàng huánghòu), and bowed to her as if she was the most powerful woman in land (Tiānxià Mǔ, 天下母). Her three older sisters were conferred the ranks of Ladies of Han, Guo, and Qin, and it was said that whenever the noble women were summoned to imperial gatherings, even Emperor Xuanzong's highly honored sister Li Chiying, the Princess Yuzhen, did not dare to take a seat more honorable than theirs. Emperor Xuanzong also gave his favorite daughter Princess Taihua (born of Consort Wu) to Yang Qi in marriage. The five Yang households—those of Yang Xian, Yang Qi, and the Ladies of Han, Guo, and Qin—were said to be exceedingly honored and rich, and all of the officials fought to flatter them. 

Around the same time, Consort Yang introduced her second cousin Yang Zhao (whose name was later changed to Yang Guozhong) to Emperor Xuanzong.  Yang Zhao, who flattered the emperor, rose quickly in the ranks.

Consort Yang became so favored that whenever she rode a horse, the eunuch Gao Lishi would attend her. Seven hundred laborers were conscripted to sew fabrics for her. Officials and generals flattered her by offering her exquisite tributes. In 746, she angered Emperor Xuanzong by being jealous and rude to him, and he had her sent to her cousin Yang Xian's mansion. Later that day, however, his mood was such that he could not eat, and he battered his servants for minor offenses. Gao knew that he missed Consort Yang, and requested that the treasures in Consort Yang's palace be sent to her. Emperor Xuanzong agreed, and sent imperial meals to her as well. That night, Gao requested that Emperor Xuanzong welcome Consort Yang back to the palace, a request that Emperor Xuanzong easily agreed to. Thereafter, she was even more favored, and no other imperial consort drew his favor.

In 747, when the military governor (jiedushi) An Lushan arrived at the capital Chang'an to meet Emperor Xuanzong, Emperor Xuanzong showed him much favor and allowed him into the palace. He had An honor Consort Yang as mother and Consort Yang's cousins and sisters as his brothers and sisters.

In 750, Consort Yang again offended Emperor Xuanzong with her words, and he sent her back to her clan. The official Ji Wen told Emperor Xuanzong that he had overreacted, and Emperor Xuanzong regretted his actions. He again sent imperial meals to her, and she wept to the eunuchs delivering the meal, stating:

She cut off some of her hair and had the hair taken back to Emperor Xuanzong. Emperor Xuanzong had Gao escort her back to the palace, and thereafter had even greater love for her.

In 751, An Lushan again visited Chang'an. On An's birthday on 20 February, 751, Emperor Xuanzong and Consort Yang rewarded him with clothing, treasures, and food. On 23 February, when An was summoned to the palace, Consort Yang, in order to please Emperor Xuanzong, had an extra-large infant wrapping made, and wrapped the obese An in it, causing much laughter among the ladies in waiting and eunuchs. When Emperor Xuanzong asked what was going on, Consort Yang's attendants joked that Consort Yang gave birth three days before and was washing her baby Lushan. Emperor Xuanzong was amused by the comic situation and rewarded both Consort Yang and An greatly. Thereafter, whenever An visited the capital, he was allowed free admittance to the palace, and there were rumors that he and Consort Yang had an affair, but Emperor Xuanzong discounted the rumors.

Consort Yang's cousin, Yang Guozhen, had been serving—remotely—as commander of Jiannan Circuit (headquartered in modern Chengdu, Sichuan). In 752, following Nanzhao incursions against Jiannan Circuit, chancellor Li Linfu wanted to send Yang Guozhong to Jiannan to personally supervise defenses against the Nanzhao attacks.  Consort Yang interceded on Yang Guozhong's behalf, and Yang Guozhong did not actually report to Jiannan. 

Li Linfu soon died, and Yang Guozhong became chancellor.

An Lushan's rebellion and Consort Yang's death

Yang Guozhong and An Lushan soon were in conflict, and Yang Guozhong repeatedly acted provocatively, such as arresting and executing staff members from An's mansion in Chang'an. 

In 755, An finally rebelled and marched his troops toward the capital. In order to try to placate the populace, which believed that Yang Guozhong's conflict with An Lushan had provoked the rebellion, Emperor Xuanzong considered passing the throne to his crown prince, Li Heng. Yang Guozhong, who was not on good terms with the prince, feared this development, and persuaded Consort Yang and her sisters, the Ladies of Han, Guo, and Qin, to speak against it. Emperor Xuanzong, for the time being, did not abdicate the throne.

In 756, Yang Guozhong forced General Geshu Han to engage An Lushan, at least partly out of fear that the general himself might attempt to usurp the throne.  Geshu Han was defeated and Tong Pass, the last major imperial defense, fell to An's forces. With the situation becoming desperate, Yang Guozhong suggested fleeing to Chengdu, the capital of Jiannan Circuit. On 14 July, Emperor Xuanzong, along with Consort Yang, her family, and his immediate clan members, secretly left Chang'an, heading toward Chengdu.  With him were Yang Guozhong, his fellow chancellor Wei Jiansu, the official Wei Fangjin, the general Chen Xuanli, and some eunuchs and ladies in waiting close to him.

On 15 July, Emperor Xuanzong's cortege reached Mawei Courier Station (in modern Xianyang, Shaanxi). The imperial guards were hungry and angry at Yang Guozhong.  Tibetan emissaries, who had followed the emperor, were also complaining to Yang Guozhong that they had not been fed.  General Chen Xuanli believed that Yang Guozhong's actions had provoked this disaster and reported to Li Heng that he planned to accuse Yang Guozhong.  

In this tense situation, soldiers of the imperial guard declared that Yang Guozhong was planning treason in collaboration with the Tibetan emissaries.  They killed Yang Guozhong, his son Yang Xuan, Consort Yang's sisters, the ladies of Han and Qin, and Wei Fangjin.  (Wei Jiansu was severely injured and nearly killed, but was spared at the last moment.) Yang Guozhong's wife Pei Rou and his son Yang Xi, along with Consort Yang's sister, the Lady of Guo, and her son Pei Hui tried to flee, but were killed.  The soldiers then surrounded Emperor Xuanzong's pavilion and refused to leave, even after the Emperor came out to comfort them and ordered them to disperse. 

Emperor Xuanzong then sent Gao Lishi to ask General Chen Xuanli for his advice. Chen's reply was to urge the Emperor to put Consort Yang to death.  Initially the Emperor refused, but after Wei E (Wei Jiansu's son) and Gao Lishi spoke in agreement with Chen, the Emperor eventually agreed.  He had Gao take Consort Yang to a Buddhist shrine and allow her a forced suicide, considered a more dignified death than execution.  When Consort Yang's body was shown to Chen and the other imperial guard generals, the soldiers dispersed and prepared to continue the journey. Consort Yang was buried at Mawei, without a coffin, but with masses of fragrance wrapped in purple blankets.

In 757, Prince Li Heng, who had taken the throne as Emperor Suzong, recaptured Chang'an and welcomed ex-Emperor Xuanzong, then Taishang Huang (retired emperor) back to the capital. Emperor Xuanzong went through Mawei on his way back to Chang'an. He wanted to locate Consort Yang's body and rebury her with honor. The official Li Kui spoke against it, pointing out that the imperial guard might again mutiny if he did so. However, Emperor Xuanzong secretly sent eunuchs to rebury her with a coffin. When they found the body, it had decomposed, but the fragrance bag buried with her was still fresh. The eunuchs returned with the fragrance bag, and upon its presentation to Emperor Xuanzong, he wept bitterly. When he returned to Chang'an, he had a painter create a picture of Consort Yang in a secondary palace, and often went there to view the portrait.

Personal characteristics

Yang was known for having a larger figure, in an era of Chinese history where such body types were preferred. Because of that, Yang is often compared and contrasted with Empress Zhao Feiyan, who is known for being a slender person. This, in turn, led to the four-character idiom huanfei yanshou, describing the physical range of the types of beauties between Zhao and Yang.

Modern-day description of Yang's physical size differs. She has been variously described as "rotund", "well rounded", "full-bodied", "portly", and  "obese". However, some consider the description of Yang as an obese woman to be either a misinterpretation of ancient Chinese texts, or a misapplication of modern standards on body size.

Lychee was a favorite fruit for Yang, and the emperor had the fruit, which was only grown in southern China, delivered by the imperial courier's fast horses, whose riders would take shifts day and night in a Pony Express-like manner, to the capital. Most historians believe the fruits were delivered from modern Guangdong, but some believe they came from modern Sichuan.

A copy of the outline of her right hand still exists, having been carved on a large stone at the site of the Xi'an Palace.

Yang was granted use of the Huaqing Pool which had been the exclusive private pool of previous Tang emperors.

Fashion influence
Yang is sometimes credited with the invention of the hezi, an ancient Chinese bodice.

Cultural depiction

Yang's story has been often retold. While some literature describes her as the author of much misfortune, other writings sympathize with her as a scapegoat. In the following generation, a long poem, "Chang hen ge" ("Song of Everlasting Sorrow"), was written by the poet Bai Juyi describing Emperor Xuanzong's love for her and perpetual grief at her loss.  It became an instant classic, known to and memorized by Chinese schoolchildren far into posterity.

The story of Yang and the poem also became highly popular in Japan and served as sources of inspiration for the classical novel The Tale of Genji which begins with the doomed love between an emperor and a consort, Kiritsubo, who is likened to Yang. Noh plays have been staged based on her story. A Japanese rumour states that Yang had been rescued, escaped to Japan and lived her remaining life there. In Japanese, she is known as Yōkihi.

In the novel Dream of the Red Chamber, the two ladies beside the main character Jia Baoyu, Lin Daiyu and Xue Baochai had the images of Xi Shi and Yang Guifei. Both Lin and Xi Shi are sick and weak, Xue and Yang are plump and healthy. In chapter 30, Xue got angry because Jia said she is like Yang and she is chubby. The real reason is that Xue does not have a brother like Yang Guozhong. 

Other works retelling her story include:

Literature
 Chang hen ge – Song of Everlasting Regret or Song of Everlasting Sorrow by Bai Juyi
 The Unofficial Biography of Yang Taizhen ( Yang Taizhen Waizhuan) by Yue Shi
 The Biography – Song of the Everlasting Sorrow ( Changhen Kezhuan)
 Under Heaven (Fictionalized as Wen Jian) by Guy Gavriel Kay
 Yang Yuhuan's death is featured in the wuxia novel Datang Youxia Zhuan by Liang Yusheng.

Operas
 The Drunken Concubine ( Guifei Zuijiu)
 The Unofficial Biography of Taizhen ( Taizhen Waizhuan)
 The Slope of Mawei ( Mawei Po) by Chen Hong
 The Great Concubine of Tang ( Da Tang Guifei), a contemporary Beijing opera with historical motif.

Stage plays
 The Hall of Longevity ( Changshen Dian) by Hong Sheng (洪昇) of the Qing Dynasty
 The Mirror to Grind Dust ( Mocheng Jian) by an anonymous playwright of the Ming Dynasty
 The Records of Shocking Grandeur ( Jinghong Ji) by Wu Shimei of the Ming Dynasty
 The Records of Colourful Hair ( Caihao Ji) by Tu Longlong of the Ming Dynasty
 Tang Minghuang on an Autumn Night with Wutong Tree and Rain ( Tang Minghuang Qiuye Wutong Yu) by Bai Pu of the Yuan Dynasty
 Cathay: Three Tales of China by Ping Chong

Film

 Princess Yang Kwei-Fei, 1955 Japanese film starring Machiko Kyō, directed by Kenji Mizoguchi.
 The Magnificent Concubine (Yang Kwei Fei), 1962 Hong Kong film directed by Li Han-hsiang, starring Li Li-hua. 
 Yang Guifei, 1992 Chinese film directed by Chen Jialin.
 Offspring of Concubine Yang, 1996 Chinese film directed by Xiao Feng, with Hou Junjie in the title role.
 Lady of the Dynasty, 2015 Chinese film starring Fan Bingbing.
 Legend of the Demon Cat, 2017 Chinese film directed by Chen Kaige, with Sandrine Pinna as Yang Guifei in a supporting role.

Television
 Lady Yang, a 1976 Hong Kong series produced by TVB, starring Lina Yan as Yang Yuhuan.
 Yang Gui Fei, a 1985 Taiwanese series aired on CTS.
 Tang Ming Huang, a 1990 Chinese series starring Liu Wei and Lin Fangbing as Emperor Xuanzong and Yang Yuhuan respectively.
 The Legend of Lady Yang, a 2000 Hong Kong  series produced by TVB, starring Anne Heung and Kwong Wa as Yang Yuhuan and Emperor Xuanzong respectively.
 Whatever is Takes a 2001 TVB series has Annie Man and  Benny Chan (actor) portray Yang Yuhan and Emperor Xuanzong in the final episode. 
 Da Tang Fu Rong Yuan, a 2007 Chinese series starring Fan Bingbing and Winston Chao as Yang Yuhuan and Emperor Xuanzong respectively.
 The Legend of Yang Guifei, a 2010 Chinese series starring Yin Tao and Anthony Wong as Yang Yuhuan and Emperor Xuanzong respectively.
 The Longest Day in Chang'an, a 2019 Chinese series with Xu Lu as Yang Yuhuan

Video games
 Yang Guifei appears in the mobile game Fate/Grand Order as a foreigner-class servant - her beauty and the unrest it causes are attributed to her serving an Outer God.

Gallery

See also
 Huaqing Pool
 Li Bai

Notes and references

 Old Book of Tang, vol. 51.
 New Book of Tang, vol. 76.
 Zizhi Tongjian, vols. 215, 216, 217, 218.

External links

 The Yang Kwei-fei story Yang Kwei-fei and The Song of Eternal Sorrow in The Tale of Genji

719 births
756 deaths
Tang dynasty imperial consorts
Tang dynasty Taoists
Emperor Xuanzong of Tang
8th-century Chinese women
8th-century Chinese people
Forced suicides of Chinese people
Suicides by hanging in China
Chinese concubines
Suicides in the Tang dynasty
People from Yongji, Shanxi
People from Yuncheng